Song-Hee Kim (born 16 July 1988) is a South Korean professional golfer who played on the United States-based LPGA Tour.

Professional wins (5)

Futures Tour (5)
2006 (5) Louisiana Pelican Classic, IOS Golf Classic, Aurora Health Care Championship, CIGNA Chip in For A Cure FUTURES Golf Classic, The Gettysburg Championship

Results in LPGA majors

CUT = missed the half-way cut
T = tied

LPGA Tour career summary

Official as of the 2013 season

Team appearances
Amateur
Espirito Santo Trophy (representing South Korea): 2004

Professional
Lexus Cup (representing Asia team): 2008

References

External links

Profile on Seoul Sisters site

South Korean female golfers
LPGA Tour golfers
1988 births
Living people